Sibirsky (masculine), Sibirskaya (feminine) or Sibirskoye (neuter) is the name of several rural localities in Russia.

Modern localities
Sibirskoye, Kaliningrad Oblast, a settlement in Turgenevsky Rural Okrug of Polessky District of Kaliningrad Oblast
Sibirskoye, Novovarshavsky District, Omsk Oblast, a settlement in Novorossiysky Rural Okrug of Novovarshavsky District of Omsk Oblast
Sibirskoye, Russko-Polyansky District, Omsk Oblast, a selo in Sibirsky Rural Okrug of Russko-Polyansky District of Omsk Oblast
Sibirsky, Altai Krai, a closed settlement in Altai Krai
Sibirsky, Khanty–Mansi Autonomous Okrug, a settlement in Khanty-Mansiysky District of Khanty-Mansi Autonomous Okrug
Sibirsky, Novosibirsk Oblast, a settlement in Kupinsky District of Novosibirsk Oblast
Sibirsky, Pervomaysky District, Altai Krai, a settlement in Sibirsky Selsoviet of Pervomaysky District of Altai Krai
Sibirsky, Tambov Oblast, a settlement in Nizhneshibryaysky Selsoviet of Uvarovsky District of Tambov Oblast
Sibirsky, Voronezh Oblast, a settlement in Gnilovskoye Rural Settlement of Ostrogozhsky District of Voronezh Oblast

Abolished localities
Sibirsky, Kemerovo Oblast, a settlement in Tarasovskaya Rural Territory of Prokopyevsky District of Kemerovo Oblast; abolished in November 2012

References